Moynat is a Parisian trunkmaker, founded in Paris in 1849 by Octavie and François Coulembier. They collaborated with a specialist in travel goods, named Pauline Moynat, to open the company's first store at Avenue de l'Opera. The house is notable for its innovations in making trunks lighter and waterproof, and for its participation in the various World's Fairs.

History

The meeting of two families
The House of Moynat was the result of a meeting between Pauline Moynat, who sold travel goods in the Opera district of Paris, and the Coulembier family, manufacturers from the faubourgs – the inner suburbs to the north of the city.

In 1849, the trunk makers opened their first atelier. They joined forces with Pauline Moynat to open the Moynat boutique in 1869 on what was then the Place du Théâtre Français (now the Place André Malraux) opposite the famous Comédie-Française. The boutique was situated at the heart of Haussmann’s redesigned Paris, and following the construction of the Avenue de l'Opéra in 1876, it took pride of place at nº.1, later to become the oldest shop on the avenue. The Moynat boutique became an institution, staying open continuously for well over a hundred years until 1976.

The destiny of the House of Moynat and three generations of Coulembier
The collaboration between Pauline Moynat and the family of manufacturers began with François Coulembier, continuing with his sons Jules Ferdinand, Edmond, Louis and Maurice. The house reached the height of its commercial powers under the direction of the founder’s grandsons, profiting from the rise of the automobile to become a design reference in the context of this new mode of transport.

The business remained in the hands of the Coulembier family until 1976.

The factory
In 1907 the Coulembier family began construction on a model-factory at 15, rue Coysevox up at Montmartre. With some 1500m² of space situated in a four-story building, the factory employed more than 250 workers. Most employees at the factory were specialist artisans who built all the Moynat trunks. For the first time ever in Paris all the specialist skills associated with trunk-making were gathered together in one place.

Innovation
Moynat patented its first inventions for packaging materials in 1854. The label was the first to use hardened gutta-percha waterproofing to produce its trunks and packing boxes. In 1870, Moynat brought out the wicker trunk, known as the "English trunk" or "Moynat trunk", a lightweight structure consisting of a wicker frame, covered with a varnished canvas and leather trimming. The product weighed a mere two kilos and was highly sought after by travellers wishing to avoid excess baggage fees.

In 1889 Jules Coulembier perfected a whole new system of lightweight trunks, followed in 1910 by the invention of an extra-light, unbreakable model.

The House of Moynat also produced a series of security mechanisms for its trunks.

Moynat and the World’s Fairs
Moynat was a regular participant in World's Fairs since the second edition in Paris in 1867.
The house also took part in the Exposition universelle in Paris in 1900, Brussels in 1910 and was appointed jury member at the Turin exhibition in 1911, and was awarded two gold medals and two special prizes at Ghent in 1913.

However, it was in 1925 that Moynat broke the record at the Exposition Internationale des Arts Décoratifs et Industriels, where its automobile trunks were a great success, awarded a Diplôme d’Honneur by its peers together with a number of gold, silver and bronze medals, a record of achievement that distinguished Moynat as the leading French malletier (trunk maker) of the time.

Collaboration with Henri Rapin
In 1905, the Moynat began a long-lasting collaboration with Henri Rapin, creative director. Rapin designed the logos of the House, the Moynat monogram, illustrated the product catalogues and conceived the models presented at universal and international exhibitions.

After the Coulembier 
Moynat closed its boutique at the Place du Théâtre Français in 1976. Its trunks however, continued to travel around the world. The Scholl family bought the rights to the house in the early 1980s for use by its company Malles et Voyages.  Orcofi, the Vuitton family's holding company, bought Malles et Voyages in 1989, following the disposal of the bulk of its shares in LVMH. Orcofi's CEO, Vuitton's former President Henry Racamier (1912-2003), had planned to relaunch Moynat as a competitor to Louis Vuitton. However, Orcofi was eventually sold to AXA in 1996 and its assets were stripped, thus the ambitious plans to relaunch Moynat never saw the light of day.

Revival
Luxury goods holding company, Luvanis SA, bought the rights into Moynat in the late 2000s, and developed a revival plan and assigned the brand to Groupe Arnault. LVMH CEO Bernard Arnault's holding company bought Moynat in 2010.

LVMH hired designer Ramesh Nair to be artistic director for Moynat.

In December 2011, Moynat reopened with a flagship store at 348 Rue Saint-Honoré, followed by shops in London in 2014, Hong Kong, Beijing in 2015, Tokyo, New York, Seoul, Taipei in 2016, Singapore in 2017, and Dubai in 2018.

See also

Au Départ
Aux Etats-Unis
Goyard
Louis Vuitton

References

Bibliography 
 Bagages en escale, Musée de la Chemiserie et de l'Elégance Masculine
 Barre Fils, M.A. de la, De la Gutta-Percha et de son application aux dentures artificielles, Victor Masson, 1852
 Brunhammer, Yvonne, Catalogue de l’exposition des Porcelaines de Sèvres de style Art Déco au musée Teien de Tokyo 1993
 Caracalla, Jean-Paul, Le goût du Voyage – Histoire de la Compagnie des Wagons-lits, Flammarion, 2001
 Centorame, Bruno (dir.), Autour de la Madeleine. Art, littérature et Société, Paris, Action artistique de la Ville de Paris, 2005
 Chapel, Edmond, Le Caoutchouc et la Gutta-Percha, Ed. Marchal et Billiard, 1892
 Devauges, Jean-Denys, Le voyage en France : du maître de poste au chef de gare, 1740–1914, Réunion des musées nationaux, 1997
 Espanet, Luisa, Valises & Compagnies, Genleman Editeur, 1987
 Gregory, Alexis, L'âge d'or dur voyage 1880-1939, Chêne, 1990
 Havard, Henry, Dictionnaire de l'ameublement et de la décoration depuis le XIIIe siècle jusqu’à nos jours, Fairault, 1901.
 Invitation au voyage, catalogue de l'exposition organisé par l'Union Centrale des Ars décoratifs, Paris, musée des Arts décoratifs, 1987
 Kjellberg, Pierre, Art Déco, les maîtres du mobilier, le décor des paquebots, Éditions de l'Amateur, Paris, 2004.
 Labourdette, Jean Henri, Un siècle de carrosserie française, Edita, 1972
 Loyer, François (dir.), Autour de l'Opéra. Naissance de la ville moderne, Action artistique de la Ville de Paris, 1995
 Rauch, André, Vacances en France de 1830 à nos jours, Hachette Littérature, 2001
 Rolland, Jean-Philippe, Kieffer-Rolland, Marie, Restauration des malles de voyage, Eyrolles, 2008
 Savary de Brûlons, Jérôme, Dictionnaire universel du commerce, Editions Jacques Estienne, 1723–1730

External links 

1849 establishments in France
Bags (fashion)
Clothing brands of France
Companies established in 1849
Fashion accessory brands
High fashion brands
Luggage brands
Luggage manufacturers
Luxury brands
Manufacturing companies based in Paris
LVMH brands